DBH Finance PLC. (also known as DBH) is a private sector non-bank financial institution in Bangladesh. It is a public limited company listed in Dhaka Stock Exchange and Chittagong Stock Exchange. It was established in 1996 by an international joint venture and started its operation in 1997. DBH specialises in real estate finance & is the largest institution in real estate finance. It is considered pioneer and market leader in the private sector housing finance. DBH is the only financial institution in Bangladesh that has been receiving the highest credit rating of 'AAA' for 7 consecutive years.

History
DBH commenced its operation in 1997 as an international joint venture to promote private sector real estate financing in Bangladesh. There were 5 promoter in the initiative out of which 3 were local & 2 were international promoters. There local promoters were Delta Life Insurance Company Limited, BRAC & Green Delta Insurance Company Limited. International sponsors included HDFC & IFC.

Initially the company was formed as a private limited company & shareholding of the company was as follows:

In 2008, the company became a public limited company & went for initial public offering (IPO). In the IPO, the company raised Taka 50 million issuing 500,000 ordinary shares. As of December 2012, the company has paid up capital of Taka 1.16 billion. Current structure of shareholding of DBH is as follows:

About the company
DBH is considered market leader in private sector real estate financing in Bangladesh. As a non-bank financial institution, DBH can operate in all the areas that a non-bank financial institution is allowed to do business in. However, it has been focusing in real estate financing only from the start which earned it the name 'specialist in housing finance'. It has a provided home loans to more than 23,000 clients so far. DBH has a very good credit rating. It has been receiving highest credit rating of 'AAA' for 15 consecutive years.

References

External links
 

Companies listed on the Dhaka Stock Exchange
Housing finance companies of Bangladesh